Sébastien Ives Bordeleau (born February 15, 1975) is a Canadian-born French former professional ice hockey forward, who played in the National Hockey League. His father is former NHL player Paulin Bordeleau.

Playing career
Born in Vancouver, British Columbia, while his father Paulin played for the Canucks, he spent several years growing up in France while his father played pro hockey there. As a youth, he played in the 1987 Quebec International Pee-Wee Hockey Tournament with team from France, and in the 1989 tournament with a minor ice hockey team from Lanaudière.

After returning to Canada he spent four years with the Hull Olympiques of the QMJHL. After being drafted by the Montreal Canadiens in the third round, 73rd overall in the 1993 NHL Entry Draft, the young forward was returned to his junior club to further develop his skills. His most productive year came in 1994–95 when he notched 52 goals.

During his first three pro seasons he played intermittently with Montreal, splitting his time with the AHL's Fredericton Canadiens. In the summer of 1998, Bordeleau was traded to the expansion Nashville Predators. He scored 16 goals and 40 points for the competitive first year club and was one of its top penalty killers. Bordeleau continued in the same role the next season, but saw less playing time in 2000–01. In the latter stages of the 2000–01 season, Bordeleau was claimed on waivers by the St. Louis Blues, yet saw only limited action with the club's AHL affiliate in Worcester before being claimed in the 2001 Waiver Draft by the Minnesota Wild.

Upon his arrival with the Wild, Bordeleau went on to split his time between the parent club and their AHL affiliate in Houston before being dealt to the Phoenix Coyotes prior to the midway point of the season. Bordeleau went on to play six games with the Coyotes, while seeing most of his action with the club's AHL affiliate in Springfield, before opting to head overseas for the 2002–03 season.

After competing for seven years in North America, Bordeleau made his debut for SC Bern in the Swiss National League in 2002–03.

International play
Bordeleau represented France at the 2004 World Championships in Prague, Czech Republic, and at the 2008 World Championships in Quebec City, Canada.

Personal life
Bordeleau is the son of former NHL player Paulin Bordeleau and the father of current San Jose Sharks forward Thomas Bordeleau.

Career statistics

Regular season and playoffs

International

References

External links
 

1975 births
Living people
EHC Biel players
Franco-Columbian people
Fredericton Canadiens players
French ice hockey players
Houston Aeros (1994–2013) players
Hull Olympiques players
Minnesota Wild players
Montreal Canadiens coaches
Montreal Canadiens draft picks
Montreal Canadiens players
Nashville Predators players
Phoenix Coyotes players
SC Bern players
Ice hockey people from Vancouver
Springfield Falcons players
Worcester IceCats players
Canadian expatriate ice hockey players in Switzerland
Canadian ice hockey centres
Canadian ice hockey coaches